This article lists the RAF Fighter Command order of battle at 15 September 1940, during the Battle of Britain.

Fighter Command

RAF Fighter Command Headquarters was located at RAF Bentley Priory, near Stanmore in North London. The commanding officer was Air Chief Marshal Hugh C.T. Dowding.

Fighter groups

Sector stations and satellite aerodromes

Sector stations had sector control rooms as well as the usual features of RAF aerodromes; they were able to control RAF fighter formations during the battle. Sector stations were also able to disperse squadrons to satellite aerodromes, most of which were fully equipped.

Stations and squadrons

See also
 RAF Fighter Command
 List of Royal Air Force aircraft squadrons
 List of Officially Accredited Battle of Britain Squadrons
 List of RAF aircrew in the Battle of Britain

References

Notes

Bibliography
 Ramsay, Winston (editor). The Battle of Britain Then and Now Mk V. London: Battle of Britain Prints International Ltd, 1989.

External links
 BattleofBritain.com  - Retrieved: 4 August 2007.

Battle of Britain
World War II orders of battle